is a maze arcade game that was released by Namco in 1994 in Japan. It features many of the characters from the company's earlier games (including: the Galaxian flagship, Pac-Man, the Rally-X Special Flag, the Solvalou from Xevious, Mappy from his self-titled game and several others besides, many of whom only initially appeared in the game they were created for).

Gameplay

Pitt (and Patti) must walk around the mazes, collecting items and avoiding enemies (which include the Heitai from Toy Pop along with the Pookas and Fygars from Dig Dug); however, they have the power to drop their Tinker Balls, which are both invulnerable to the enemies, and move around by pressing the Line button, therefore creating a line between them and their balls. Releasing the button makes their balls come back to them; the enemies are killed by having the balls slam into them. There are also pieces of popcorn which can be picked up around the mazes - and pressing the Popcorn button, Pitt and Patti can throw them at the enemies, and they shall bounce off the walls until they hit one (or evaporate if they have not done so by the end of the stage). Killing all enemies in a maze advances the player to the next stage; however, in the event of one enemy remaining, he will make for the nearest corner of the maze, say "Bye-bye!", and disappear (which shall detract from the "Pursuit Bonus" that the players will receive after they defeat Mao at the end of the game).

Reception
In Japan, Game Machine listed Tinkle Pit on their April 15, 1994 issue as being the twenty-first most-popular arcade game at the time.

Scott Alan Marriot of Classic Gamer in 2004 believed Tinkle Pit carried the same kind of simplicity present in games like Pac-Man (1980) and Dig Dug (1982). In 2015, Retro Gamer found the game to be strange yet charming, liking its level variety and simplistic mechanics. They blamed the genre's severe decline in popularity and its confinement to Japan as the reasons for its obscurity, and said that it would appeal to Namco fans for its amount of references and cameos to their other properties. Retro Gamer also viewed it as a good example of the transitioning video and arcade game scene of the decade, writing: "If you ever need reminding that the arcade market of the early Nineties was a weird, transitional scene, Tinkle Pit should serve well."

Notes

References

External links

1993 video games
Arcade video games
Arcade-only video games
Crossover video games
Japan-exclusive video games
Maze games
Namco arcade games
Video games developed in Japan